No. 157 Helicopter Unit is a Helicopter Unit and is equipped with Mil Mi-17V5 and based at Barrackpore Air Force Station.

History

Assignments

Aircraft
Mil Mi-17V5

References

157